The 1997 Women's Lacrosse World Cup was the fifth Women's Lacrosse World Cup and was played in Edogawa, Tokyo, Japan from 27 April – 4 May 1997. The United States defeated Australia in the final to win the tournament.

Results

Group

Table

Fifth Place (May 4)
Canada v Scotland 6-5

Third Place (May 4)
England v Wales 18-4

Final (May 4)
United States v Australia 3-2 (OT)

References

2009 Women's
1997 in lacrosse
Lacrosse World Cup
Women's sport in Japan
1997 in Tokyo